Emily Escobedo (born December 17, 1995) is an American swimmer. She competed in the women's 200 metre breaststroke event at the 2021 FINA World Swimming Championships (25 m) in Abu Dhabi, winning the gold medal.

References

External links
 

1995 births
Living people
American female freestyle swimmers
Sportspeople from New Rochelle, New York
Swimmers from New York (state)
Medalists at the FINA World Swimming Championships (25 m)
Medalists at the 2019 Summer Universiade
Universiade gold medalists for the United States
Universiade silver medalists for the United States
Universiade medalists in swimming
21st-century American women